McFeely is a surname. Notable people with the surname include:

Anthony McFeely (1909–1986), Irish Roman Catholic bishop
Bernard N. McFeely (1882–1949), American politician
Stephen McFeely (born 1969), American screenwriter
W. Drake McFeely (born c. 1954), American publisher
William S. McFeely (1930–2019), American academic and historian

Fictional characters
Mr. McFeely, a character in the television series Mister Rogers' Neighborhood

See also
Elizabeth Craig-McFeely (born 1927), British Director of the Women's Royal Naval Service